Discolized is the debut album from the Danish house DJ and producer Kato in collaboration with a number of DJs and vocal artists. The album was co-produced by Kato and Ahmad Darwich. Discolized was released on 1 March 2010 reaching No. 6 on the Danish Albums Chart. The album was reissued on 4 April 2011 under the title Discolized 2.0 that includes new versions, remixes and singles "Sjus" and "Speakers On" on two CDs.

Track listings

Discolized (2010)
"My House (2010)" (4:19)
"Turn the Lights Off" (featuring Jon) (2:57)
"Desert Walk" (featuring Outlandish) (3:31)
"Makka" (5:07)
"Discolized" (Kato & Terri B.)	(3:21)
"Alive" (5:50)
"It's My Life" (featuring Dr. Alban & Tony T & Carl Pritt) (3:21)
"Opa" (4:23)
"Remember My Name" (featuring Jon) (3:37)
"Crowd Control" (6:10)
"Runnin' Away" (featuring Estella) (4:09)
"P.Y.H.I.T.A.R.N" (3:59)
"Crossed the Line" (featuring Morten Luco) (3:41)
"Hey Shorty (Yeah Yeah Pt. II)" (featuring U$O & Johnson) (3:15)
"Lullaby" (3:45)

Discolized 2.0 (2011)
CD1
"Discolized 2.0" (Kato & Terri B)	 
"Sjus" (featuring Ida Corr, Camille Jones & Johnson) (Kato Edit)	 
"Speakers On" (Kato & Infernal)	 
"Fuck hvor er det fedt (at være hip hop'er)" (featuring Clemens)	 
"Turn the Lights Off" (featuring Jon)	 
"Celebrate Life" (featuring Jeremy Carr)	 
"Desert Walk" (featuring Outlandish)	 
"Hey Shorty (Yeah Yeah Pt. II)" (featuring U$O & Johnson)	 
"Remember My Name 2.0" (featuring Jon)	 
"Happiness" (featuring Jeremy Carr)	 
"My House 2.0" (featuring Brandon Beal & Negash Ali)	 
"Champion Part II" (Clemens & Jon)
CD2
"Helele" (Velile & Safri Duo) (Kato Remix)	 
"Desert Walk" (featuring Outlandish) (Kato Remix)	 
"Kato på maskinerne" (Hej Matematik) (Extended)	 
"Velkommen til Medina" (Medina) (Kato Remix)	 
"Turn the Lights Off" (featuring Jon) (Dave Darell Remix)	 
"Har det hele" (Rune RK featuring Karen & Jooks) (Kato Remix)	 
"You & Me" (Electric Lady Lab) (Kato Remix)	 
"Are You Gonna Go My Way" (featuring Ian Dawn) (Jack Rowan Midnight Bomb Mix)	 
"Burn It" (Carpark North) (Kato Remix)	 
"Sjus" (featuring Ida Corr, Camille Jones & Johnson) (Hedegaard Remix)	 
"Seek Bromance" (Tim Berg) (Kato Remix)	 
"Hey Shorty (Yeah Yeah Pt. II)" (featuring U$O & Johnson) (Jack Rowan Remix)	 
"I nat" (Svenstrup & Vendelboe featuring Karen) (Kato Remix)

Chart performance

References

2010 albums
2011 albums